This is a list of the flora of Queensland listed as Extinct in the Wild (formerly Presumed Extinct) under the Nature Conservation Act 1992.

 Acianthus ledwardii
 Amphibromus whitei
 Amphineuron immersum
 Antrophyum austroqueenslandicum
 Argyreia soutteri
 Corchorus thozetii
 Dimocarpus leichhardtii
 Diplocaulobium masonii
 Huperzia serrata
 Hymenophyllum lobbii
 Hymenophyllum whitei
 Lemmaphyllum accedens
 Lindsaea pulchella var. blanda
 Lycopodium volubile
 Marsdenia araujacea
 Monogramma dareicarpa
 Musa fitzalanii
 Oberonia attenuata
 Oldenlandia tenelliflora var. papuana
 Paspalum batianoffii
 Persoonia prostrata
 Prostanthera albohirta
 Rhaphidospora cavernarum
 Tapeinosperma flueckigeri
 Teucrium ajugaceum
 Tmesipteris lanceolata
 Trichomanes exiguum
 Wendlandia psychotrioides
 Zieria sp. (Russell River S.Johnson in 1892)

References
 http://www.legislation.qld.gov.au/LEGISLTN/SLS/2000/00SL354.pdf

Queensland Nature Conservation Act flora
Queensland Nature Conservation Act extinct in the wild
Environment of Queensland
Extinct flora of Australia
Extinct flora of Queensland